Doolwala Galapitage Hemachandra Sirisena (born 03 January 1914) was a Ceylonese entrepreneur and politician. He served as Deputy Minister of Labour in the Second Sirimavo Bandaranaike cabinet. Having produced fireworks since 1927, Sirisena founded the Kandiyan Fireworks Company in 1935. He was first elected to the Parliament of Sri Lanka as first member for Akurana, Harispathuwa representing the Sri Lanka Freedom Party in the 1965 parliamentary election, he was elected the second member for Akurana in the 1970 parliamentary election.

References

Sri Lankan businesspeople
Deputy ministers of Sri Lanka
Members of the 6th Parliament of Ceylon
Members of the 7th Parliament of Ceylon
Sri Lanka Freedom Party politicians
Sinhalese politicians
1914 births

Date of death missing
Year of death missing